Peter Stephen Godard,  D.D. (b & d. Cambridge 28 August 1705 - 11 July 1781) was Master of Clare College from 1762 until his death.

Godard was educated at Merchant Taylors' and Clare College, Cambridge. He became Fellow in 1727.  He was ordained a priest in the Church of England in 1730. He held incumbencies at Fornham All Saints and Whepstead. Godard was Vice-Chancellor of the University of Cambridge between 1762 and 1763.

References

People educated at Merchant Taylors' School, Northwood
Masters of Clare College, Cambridge
Fellows of Clare College, Cambridge
Alumni of Clare College, Cambridge
1781 deaths
1705 births
People from Cambridge
18th-century English Anglican priests
Vice-Chancellors of the University of Cambridge